EULYNX is a European initiative in the area of railway signalling, with the aim of reducing the cost and installation time of signalling equipment. Currently, there are 13 members from all across Europe, with baseline 1 published in March 2017 and baseline 2 published in December 2017. The project documents lay down a system architecture for interlocking systems, including standard interfaces for the individual interlocking components, that can be used in any of the participating countries. The objective is to turn interlockings into modular systems, where different parts of one interlocking can be supplied by different manufacturers while maintaining the high safety and reliability levels required of a critical railway safety system.

Introduction 
EULYNX was started in 2014 by the railway infrastructure managers of 6 European countries: Germany, Netherlands, Belgium, France, Luxembourg and Great Britain. This has expanded with time to 12 by including the railway infrastructure managers from: Finland, Norway, Sweden, Slovenia, Switzerland, Italy and Austria. The project is meant to standardise railway signalling and control interfaces, in order to reduce cost and installation time of signalling equipment.

EULYNX stems from the shorter lifetime of new signalling equipment technology, especially of interlockings which are at the core of the railway safety system. An interlocking system using mechanical technology could be expected to last up to 80 years but electronic interlocking equipment has a shorter lifetime, between 15 and 20 years.

The high cost of railway signalling equipment and the fact that until recently, suppliers operated mostly within national borders, resulted in a significant amount of technological diversity, and elements installed over many decades. When there is the need to install a new interlocking system core, this might not be compatible with the old field elements, such as signals and level crossing protection systems, forcing a substitution of elements that are still decades away from their expected end of lifecycle. Mergers and acquisitions in the supplying industry also mean less competition which can be another factor driving up costs.

By standardising the system architecture and interfaces of railway signalling equipment, the lifecycle of the interlocking core can be decoupled from the field elements, which have longer lifecycles, changing the traditional business logic of using a complete system from one manufacturer. Furthermore, the intellectual property (IP) rights of the specifications belong to the project partners, contrary to when buying off the shelf products. The use of this approach enables manufacturers to bid for only a particular component, thereby lowering entry costs and increasing opportunities for competition. Furthermore, when a component has to be replaced, any company can supply that particular product.

Aims 
EULYNX aims to reinforce the process of defining and standardising interfaces in the future railway digital control command communication, signalling and automation system. The process of digitization in the railway industry provides a huge opportunity to reduce costs by improving efficiency, streamlining processes and reliability. The major goal is to increase the railway capacity and reliability with a significant reduction in the life-cycle cost of the system.

Implementation 
The technical documents are published in stages, with baseline 1, covering CENELEC phases 1 - 4/5 published in 31 of March 2017 and baseline 2 published in December 2017, at the moment the consortium is working on the development of the state machines corresponding to the baseline 2 requirements. Part of the specifications are openly available and the more detailed specifications require a previous registration.

Bane NOR the Norwegian railway infrastructure manager has introduced EULYNX requirements in its ERTMS expansion programme, including equipping rolling stock and installing its whole network with ETCS level 2 signalling system. Both the signalling system and the traffic management system are now required to have EULYNX interfaces.

SŽ-Infrastructure has also announced the roll-out of EULYNX-compliant equipment in Slovenia after 2020.

DB Netz is in a pre-series phase until 2019, using EULYNX requirements in ongoing signalling projects, while the specifications are completed. Production phase will follow.

EULYNX specifications are also implemented in the Reference CCS Architecture (RCA) initiative, based on the white paper released in 2018.

Other effects 
EULYNX uses formal methods which are essential in other high-tech industries but not used widely by the railway infrastructure managers. The introduction of a distributed safety system is also pioneering in the sector, leading the way for other projects that need to go through a similar certification process.

References 

Railway associations
Railway safety
Railway signalling
Signal boxes
Standards
Train protection systems